Jerzy Krzysztof Eisler (born 12 June 1952 in Warsaw) is a Polish historian, focusing mostly on the history of Poland during the communist era. He is a professor at the History Institute of the Polish Academy of Sciences, and member of the Institute of National Remembrance in Warsaw. In 1994-97 he was a principal of Adam Mickiewicz Polish school in Paris. Eisler gained a title of professor in 2002 and was awarded the Silver Cross of Merit medal in 2006.

Works 
In Communist Poland, Eisler primarily researched Vichy France to avoid censorship; however, during the 80s, as Solidarity gained mileage in Polish politics, he authored texts on contemporary history for circulation in the underground. In post-Communist Poland, his habilitation dissertation was on the 1968 Polish political crisis.

Works 
 Od monarchizmu do faszyzmu. Koncepcje polityczno - społeczne prawicy francuskiej 1918 - 1940 (From Monarchism to Fascism. Sociopolitical Conceptions of the French Right 1918-1940) (1987)
 Kolaboracja we Francji 1940 - 1944 (Collaboration in France 1940-1944) (1989)
 Marzec 1968. Geneza - przebieg - konsekwencje (1991)
 Zarys dziejów politycznych Polski 1944 - 1989 (1992)
 List 34 (Letter 34) (1993)
 Grudzień 1970. Geneza - przebieg - konsekwencje (2000)
 Polski rok 1968 (Polish Year 1968) (2006)
 "Polskie miesiące" czyli kryzys(y) w PRL (2008)

References

External links
 

20th-century Polish historians
Polish male non-fiction writers
University of Warsaw alumni
1952 births
Writers from Warsaw
Living people
Historians of Poland
Recipients of the Silver Cross of Merit (Poland)
Recipients of the Gold Cross of Merit (Poland)
Recipients of the Silver Medal for Merit to Culture – Gloria Artis
Officers of the Order of Polonia Restituta
People associated with the Institute of National Remembrance
21st-century Polish historians